Crossing the Border: Fifteen Tales is a collection of short stories by Joyce Carol Oates written while the author was residing in Canada (1968 – 1978). Published simultaneously by Vanguard Press in the United States and by Cage Publishing Company, Agincourt, Canada in 1976. The stories had appeared previously (1974 – 1976) in different US and Canadian magazines, often in different versions.
Seven of the stories, "Crossing the Border", "Hello Fine Day Isn’t It", "Natural Boundaries", "Customs", "The Scream", "An Incident in The Park", and "River Rising" depict conjugal life of an American couple, Reneé and Evan Maynard, in Canada. The characters in "The Transformation of Vincent Scoville" and "The Liberation of Jake Hanley" are instructors at the same Canadian college. The rest of the stories are not connected to each other.

The collection has drawn critical attention. Anne Tyler observes, ‘… “Crossing the Border” revolves around borders, … but the borders, … are only nominally geographical. Although most of the stories concern Americans in Canada ― people whose private sense of disengagement is intensified by their life in a culture half foreign, half familiar ― the real borders are personal: the boundaries by which each individual defines himself and, rightly or wrongly, fends off other individuals.’ But of course these personal boundaries also have to be „crossed“, transcended, and therefore the stories are also concerned with transitions of the psychic boundaries which characterize the individual, with the development from one level of consciousness to another one.

Stories 

"Crossing the Border"
"Love. Friendship"
"Hello Fine Day Isn’t It"
"Through the Looking Glass"
"Natural Boundaries"
"Dreams"
"Customs"
"The Transformation of Vincent Scoville"
"The Golden Madonna"
"The Scream"
"The Liberation of Jake Hanley"
"An Incident in The Park"
"Falling in Love in Ashton, British Columbia"
"The Tempter"
"River Rising"

External links 
 Joyce Carol Oates. Crossing the Border at the Internet Archive (Sign in required).

References 

Short story collections by Joyce Carol Oates
1976 short story collections
Works about Canada–United States relations
Vanguard Press books